Durvazury is a village in Narail Sadar Upazila, Narail District, Khulna Division, in south-west Bangladesh.

References

Narail District
Populated places in Khulna Division